Gold: 35th Anniversary Edition is a two-disc compilation released by the Carpenters in early 2004.

The album is essentially the expanded US release of a European compilation released in 2000, titled Gold: Greatest Hits (the same title as ABBA's), which peaked at #4 on the UK Albums Chart. That version contained just one disc with 20 tracks, all of which were also featured on this American version. The covers of both releases have the same look as the 1992 Gold: Greatest Hits compilation album by ABBA. The original cover artwork had "Greatest Hits" in place of where "35th Anniversary Edition" is on the US cover. An accompanying DVD followed in 2002.

Track listing

Disc one

Disc two

Remix notes
Most of the songs listed here are remixes. This compilation's songs have more refined and re-recorded tracks, less noise in the background, and a lot of reverberation in the background.
 These songs are the original mixes, meaning that they have not been retouched since their recording.
 These songs include a harder bass drum line and considerably more reverberation than the original version. "Top of the World" is mixed with an alternate ending to segue into "Maybe It's You".
 All of these songs (with the exception of "Tryin' to Get the Feeling Again") are from the album As Time Goes By, but all of these were remixed. The tracks from As Time Goes By were remixed in the late 1990s/early 2000s, and "Tryin' to Get the Feeling Again", from Interpretations, was originally recorded in 1975, but was left off Horizon due to the fact that it would have been too long. It was subsequently remixed in the mid-1990s.
 This version of "Solitaire" can only be found on this album. This version is the single version, which Richard Carpenter claimed to have a guitar riff before each of the verses, whereas the version on Horizon had no guitar riff.
 "Calling Occupants" is a longer version including a comedic introduction, where an alien speaks to a radio call-in show.
 "Ticket to Ride", the only song here that is of a 1973 remix, is a fully re-recorded version of the original. Karen did not appreciate the deep vocals of the original, and felt that she could do a better job for The Singles: 1969–1973. Thus, it was re-recorded, and has not been touched since then.

Gold: Greatest Hits
"Yesterday Once More" – 3:59
"Superstar" – 3:47
"Rainy Days and Mondays" – 3:35
"Goodbye to Love" – 3:56
"It's Going to Take Some Time" – 2:59
"I Won't Last a Day Without You" – 3:54
"For All We Know" – 2:32
"Jambalaya (On the Bayou)" – 3:37
"Touch Me When We're Dancing" – 3:21
"Please Mr. Postman" – 2:48
"I Need to Be in Love" – 3:50
"Solitaire" – 4:41
"We've Only Just Begun" – 3:05
"(They Long to Be) Close to You" – 3:41
"This Masquerade" – 4:53
"Ticket to Ride" – 4:09
"Top of the World" – 2:58
"Only Yesterday" – 3:46
"Sing" – 3:20
"Calling Occupants of Interplanetary Craft" – 7:09

Some editions contain "Hurting Each Other" as a bonus track.

Personnel
Richard Carpenter – compilation producer, liner notes
Bernie Grundman – mastering at Bernie Grundman Mastering
Stewart Whitmore – assembling at Marcussen Mastering
Mike Ragogna – project director
Adam Abrams, Barry Korkin and Lee Lodyga – project coordination

Alternative version
A Canadian release from A&M Records/Universal Music Canada is dated 2005 and is simply titled Gold, without a subtitle. The 22-page booklet has a colour photo cover, not the original black cover.

References

Carpenters
The Carpenters compilation albums
2004 greatest hits albums